Dylan Wotherspoon (born 9 April 1993) is an Australian International Field Hockey player who plays for HC 's-Hertogenbosch. His normal position is forward. He won a gold medal in the 2018 Commonwealth Games.

Club career
Wotherspoon played his junior career for Redbacks Hockey Club in Murwillumbah before relocating to Brisbane in 2010 to play with Eastern Suburbs Hockey Club in the Brisbane Hockey League.

Wotherspoon was signed by Dabang Mumbai for $35,750US for the 2016 Hockey India League.

Later in 2016, Wotherspoon was signed by Hoofdklasse club HC 's-Hertogenbosch for the 2016–17 season. After a successful season in the Netherlands, Wotherspoon returned home in 2017 to play with Labrador HC.

Dylan was also a regular member of the Queensland Blades team in the Australian Hockey League.

In 2019 Dylan was signed by Brisbane Blaze in the inaugural Hockey One season.

In 2021 Dylan re-signed with HC 's-Hertogenbosch.

International career

2014
Dylan Wotherspoon made his senior international debut against India in late 2014.

2015
In April 2015 he made his tournament debut in the 2015 Sultan Azlan Shah Cup, scoring 3 goals in the tournament. Wotherspoon scored his first ever international goal in this tournament, scoring in Australia's 7–0 win over Canada.
In December 2015 was selected for the 2014-15 Men's FIH Hockey World League Final where he scored 2 goals, including in the semi-final against The Netherlands.

2016
In 2016 he was named in the squad for the 2016 Men's Hockey Champions Trophy in London, but had to withdraw with injury, which also ruled him out of the 2016 Olympic Games. In November 2016 Wotherspoon returned from injury to be named player of the tournament in the 2016 Men's International Festival of Hockey in Melbourne.

2017
In April Wotherspoon was named in the squad for the 2017 Sultan Azlan Shah Cup and scored a goal in the tournament final.
In July he was selected for the 2016–17 Men's FIH Hockey World League Semifinals in Johannesburg. In October, Wotherspoon scored 7 goals in Australia's Oceania Cup triumph.
In December he was selected for the 2016–17 Men's FIH Hockey World League Final where he was awarded his 50th cap and scored 2 goals, including in the semi-final against Germany.

2018
In February 2018 Wotherspoon played in all four test matches against The Netherlands in Perth. He then played all 6 matches and scored two goals in Australia's successful Sultan Azlan Shah Cup tournament win in March 2018.
In April 2018 Dylan won a gold medal as part of Australia's gold medal-winning team in the 2018 Commonwealth Games in Dylan's home city of The Gold Coast. Dylan played all 6 matches, scoring a goal against Scotland and two goals against Canada.
In September, Dylan was selected for the 2018 Men's International Hockey Open in Darwin. He scored in the opening match, a 5–2 victory over Malaysia, then netted a hat-trick in the 3–0 win over Japan. Despite losing 2–1 to Argentina in the final, Wotherspoon finished the tournament as the top goal scorer with 4 goals.
Dylan was named in the Kookaburra's squad to play in the 2018 World Cup in Bhubaneswar where he played in all six matches  and scored a goal against China.

2019
After being rotated from the squad for the opening fixtures of the 2019 Men's FIH Pro League, Wotherspoon scored his 30th international goal in the 4–2 win over Germany in Hobart in February. He then played in the 2–1 win over Spain in Sydney, as well as in the 3–2 win over Argentina and 5–1 win over New Zealand, both in Sydney in March. Unfortunately he injured his hamstring after only 5 minutes during the 3-4 Anzac Day win over New Zealand in Auckland and could not return to the field. Dylan returned from injury to the squad for the European leg of the League in June 2019.

2020
Dylan started the year playing in the 2020 Men's FIH Pro League, scoring his 31st international goal against Great Britain. In February Dylan celebrated his 90th cap by scoring against India in Odisha.

Personal life

Dylan's younger brother Blake is a former Australian under 21 international who played for HC Klein Zwitserland.

References

External links
 
 
 
 

1993 births
Living people
Australian male field hockey players
Field hockey players at the 2010 Summer Youth Olympics
Commonwealth Games medallists in field hockey
Commonwealth Games gold medallists for Australia
2018 Men's Hockey World Cup players
HC Den Bosch players
Male field hockey forwards
Field hockey players at the 2018 Commonwealth Games
Youth Olympic gold medalists for Australia
Sportsmen from New South Wales
Expatriate field hockey players
Australian expatriate sportspeople in the Netherlands
Medallists at the 2018 Commonwealth Games